Pedro Miguel da Silva Rocha (born 6 March 1985 in Póvoa de Varzim), commonly known as Pedrinho, is a Portuguese professional footballer who plays as a right back.

Honours
Aves
Taça de Portugal: 2017–18

References

External links

1985 births
Living people
People from Póvoa de Varzim
Portuguese footballers
Association football defenders
Primeira Liga players
Liga Portugal 2 players
Varzim S.C. players
Associação Académica de Coimbra – O.A.F. players
Rio Ave F.C. players
C.D. Aves players
Leixões S.C. players
Ligue 1 players
FC Lorient players
Portuguese expatriate footballers
Expatriate footballers in France
Portuguese expatriate sportspeople in France
Sportspeople from Porto District